Madeline Westen is a fictional character in the television series Burn Notice portrayed by Sharon Gless. She is Michael Westen's neurotic, chain-smoking mother.

Overview
It is unclear how much Madeline knows about her son's life as a spy. All she seems to know is that he tends to be in a different city, in a different country, or generally in a different place and that he can not disclose where he is. Madeline is thrilled when Michael is back in Miami and hopes that he will stay. She occasionally asks him for help with her friends' problems.

Madeline's relationship with Michael has been tumultuous, and complicated by the fact that her husband, and the father of her children, regularly abused them. Madeline believes that Michael aggravated his father and that this was the reason for Michael's father's beatings. She later allowed Michael to join the military at 17 by forging his father's signature on his enlistment forms. Michael didn’t know this until she told him why she did it for many reasons. The first being that Michael was on the verge of going to jail, and the second being that his father would never allow it. Madeline has been angry at Michael for years for an assortment of reasons, such as not attending his father's funeral. Upon his arrival in Miami, she asked Michael to visit his grave in exchange for his father's vintage Dodge Charger.

Madeline keeps up with her son Michael's actions through his friend and ally Fiona Glenanne.

Throughout the series, Madeline has often been drawn into events in one way or another, which has made her more aware of what Michael and his friends are doing. In the pilot episode, Madeline is depicted as an unstable hypochondriac woman. This characterization was discarded in future episodes to be replaced by the more no-nonsense, self-supportive woman that she would remain for the rest of the series. This change is also characterized by the haircut she receives.

While she's still not "officially" told about Michael's position as a spy, she has actively helped out on occasions, such as assisting with surveillance in the season 3 episode "Friends Like These", or even successfully interrogating a captive about Michael's whereabouts in "The Hunter", while Fiona and Sam were still arguing about the best approach. She does not like the truth about Michael's life, and her fears are brought to light when she is forced to defend him in an FBI interrogation, in the third-season finale; the bureau questions her concerning the activities that got him burned, along with many other actions in his spy career. While she can deter Michael from returning, she is ultimately detained. However, when Michael disables Simon, both disappear and Madeline is freed, but she anguishes at the disappearance of her son.

In season 4, after former counterintelligence agent Jesse Porter joins the team, he moves in with Madeline. She begins to form a true friendship with Jesse and forms a mother-son-like bond with him. Knowing that her son accidentally burned Jesse, Madeline, like Fiona, expresses her dislike for all the lies that Michael continues to tell Jesse. At one point, she decides to go to Tampa to stay with a friend she doesn't really like, for fear of letting the truth slip out and of how Jesse's reaction if he found out.

Madeline is often critical of Michael's methodologies. But in Season 5, when Michael tells her that Anson Fullerton caused the heart attack that killed her husband, she implores Michael to "do whatever it takes" to bring Anson to justice.

In season 6, Madeline serves as Fiona's source on the outside when she needs assistance in getting things to help get her out of prison. Madeline then becomes greatly distraught and heartbroken after learning of her youngest son Nate Weston's death from Michael. Since then, she has come to blame Michael for his death, stating how Nate always idolized Michael and how Michael always held contempt for him. She felt Nate had no right to be out in the open with Michael and the others. Eventually, after getting answers over Nate's death from Card (who was really behind Nate's death), Madeline seems to have finally gotten over her strife towards Michael, stating that she needs to forgive him lest she regrets it in the future should she lose him, as she did with Nate.

In Season 7, Madeline gains custody of her grandson Charlie and begins to take care of him. She is targeted by Nate's former bookie but forces Fiona to make the bookie look corrupt by using his ledger to get him to leave Madeline alone. James also pays her an unannounced visit, causing Madeline to converse while holding him at gunpoint as James assures her that he only wishes to protect her and her grandson.

In the series finale, Madeline is forced to burn her house to the ground and go on the run with Fiona from James' men. After Michael, Sam and Fiona enter James' communication/relay center with the intent of gathering evidence to use against him, James sends his men to where Madeline, Jesse, and Charlie are hiding. Knowing that they don't stand a chance against James' men, and are only armed with a single C-4 charge (without a remote detonator), Madeline decides to sacrifice her life for Charlie's safety as well as Michael's. As Jesse and Charlie take cover, Madeline manually detonates the C-4, killing her and James' men instantly as they enter. Her last words are, "This one's for my boys."

In the series pilot, the actress wears a wig, but throughout the rest of the series, her real hair is featured.

References

External links
 Burn Notice: Madeline Westen character biography at USA.com
 Burned in Miami: Madeline Westen, an unofficial fansite

Burn Notice characters
Television characters introduced in 2007
Fictional hypochondriacs